The visa policy of Malaysia consists of the requirements for foreign nationals to travel to, enter, and remain in Malaysia. Most visitors to Malaysia are granted visa-free entry for a period of 90, 30, or 14 days respectively. However, nationals from some countries must first obtain a visa from one of the Malaysian Diplomatic Missions before being allowed into the country. All visitors must hold a passport valid for at least 6 months.

Visa policy map

Visa free
According to Timatic, holders of passports issued by the following jurisdictions can enter Malaysia without a visa for up to the duration listed below.

90 days
Holders of passports issued by the following 66 jurisdictions are granted visa-free entry to Malaysia for 90 days:

1- Suitable for most of the UK passports but except British Nationals (Overseas). BN(O) holders have 30 days visa-entry permit instead

30 days
Holders of passports issued by the following 94 jurisdictions are granted visa-free entry to Malaysia for 30 days:

14 days
Holders of passports issued by the following 2 jurisdictions are granted visa-free entry to Malaysia for 14 days:

In addition, holders of  Macao Special Administrative Region Travel Permits are granted visa-free entry for 14 days.

Non-ordinary passports
Holders of diplomatic or official/service passports of Bangladesh, China and India do not require a visa for up to 30 days and 3 months respectively; however they must first request for entry permission at any port of entry in order to enter Malaysia.

A visa waiver agreement for diplomatic and official passport holders was signed with Pakistan in November 2018 and is yet to enter into force.

APEC Business Travel Card
Holders of passports issued by the following countries who possess an APEC Business Travel Card (ABTC) containing the "MYS" code on the reverse, which indicates that it is valid for travel to Malaysia, can enter Malaysia visa-free for business trips for up to 60 days.

ABTCs are issued to nationals of:

eVISA

On 1 March 2017, Malaysian government set up a new online application system to accept applications for Electronic Visa (eVISA) and Electronic Travel Registration and Information (eNTRI) to facilitate tourism. eNTRI program is good for Chinese and Indian passport holders and lasts until 31 December 2020 while eVISA is good for citizens of more countries and is still available so far.

eVISA application also applies to those seeking student or expatriate visas for entering Malaysia, although they must report to immigration authorities upon arrival in Malaysia in order to obtain their immigration passes.

The application website contains IP address detection, applicants have to apply from designated countries or they will be blocked from the application.

Details of eVISA for tourist
Applicant's nationality:

1 - for Hong Kong Document of Identity for Visa Purposes holder only (unrestricted nationality)
Place of application: all countries and territories in the world except Israel, Malaysia, North Korea and Singapore
Fee: varies by nationality and applicant's location
Place of departure: no restrictions
Port of entry and exit: any port of entry
Valid for: 3 months (multiple entries for Indian nationals, single entry for others)
Duration of stay: 30 days for single-entry eVisa holders, 15 or 30 days for multiple-entry eVISA holders
Visa review: 2 business day after application submitted, visa interview or extra proof materials may be requested

Visa on arrival
Nationals of China and India who are arriving directly from Indonesia, Singapore or Thailand and who hold a valid visa from those countries can obtain a visa on arrival to Malaysia for a maximum stay of 14 days (which cannot be extended) at Kuala Lumpur–International (KUL), Johor Bahru (JHB), Kota Kinabalu (BKI), Kuching (KCH), Miri (MYY) or Penang (PEN), provided they hold return flight tickets and at least USD 500 per person. The visa fee is 200 Malaysian ringgit; other currencies are not accepted. Boarding passes or tickets must be presented to prove that the national seeking a visa on arrival originated from one of the three aforementioned countries.

Transit

Transit pass
Nationals of certain countries that do not enjoy visa-free entry can instead be granted a free transit pass for stays of up to 120 hours when transiting through Kuala Lumpur International Airport. They must hold an onward ticket departing Malaysia from Kuala Lumpur in 120 hours, and the flight departing Malaysia must be operated by either Air Asia or Malaysia Airlines.

Nationals of the following countries are eligible:

Nationals of the following countries are only eligible for the free transit pass if they hold a visa or a residence permit issued by Australia, China, Japan, New Zealand, South Korea, Taiwan or the United States, and are departing to or arriving from these countries. They may only arrive and depart from either the main terminal or the low-cost carrier terminal (KLIA2), unless they hold a residence permit.

Other nationals
Nationals of other non visa-exempt countries can transit through Kuala Lumpur International Airport for a maximum of 24 hours; however, they are not permitted to switch between the main terminal and KLIA2 unless they hold a valid visa.

Mandatory yellow fever vaccination
Nationals of the following countries require an International Certificate of Vaccination in order to enter Malaysia: The vaccination requirement is imposed by this country for protection against Yellow Fever since the principal mosquito vector Aedes aegypti is present in its territory.

Restrictions
 Citizens of Angola, Burkina Faso, Burundi, Cameroon, Central African Republic, Congo, DR Congo, Ivory Coast, Djibouti, Equatorial Guinea, Eritrea, Ethiopia, Ghana, Guinea-Bissau, Liberia, Mali, Mozambique, Niger, Nigeria, Rwanda and Western Sahara may enter by air only.
 Citizens of Israel are banned from participating in Malaysia My Second Home programme.
 Before May 2011, citizens of Israel were not allowed entry to Malaysia. They now require a visa and an approval from the Malaysian Ministry of Home Affairs to be allowed into Malaysia.
 Previously citizens of Serbia and Montenegro were not allowed to enter Malaysia and then a special permission from the Ministry of Home Affairs was required.
 Previously citizens of Colombia were only permitted to arrive at or transit through the Kuala Lumpur International Airport.
 Following the diplomatic tensions resulting from the death of Kim Jong-nam, visa free access for citizens of North Korea ended on 6 March 2017.

Statistics

See also

 Visa requirements for Malaysian citizens
 Malaysian passport

Further reading
 Countries that require visa/do not require visa to visit Malaysia (PDF) Ministry of Foreign Affairs, Malaysia

References

External links
 List of Malaysian missions
 Immigration Department of Malaysia
 eVisa application

Malaysia
Tourism in Malaysia
Malaysian immigration law
Foreign relations of Malaysia